Tatsunori (written: 辰徳, 辰基, 建典 or 達宣) is a masculine Japanese given name. Notable people with the name include:

, Japanese footballer
, Japanese basketball player
, Japanese baseball player and manager
, Japanese footballer
, Japanese volleyball player
, Japanese footballer
, Japanese actor and musical artist

Japanese masculine given names